Jesus the Worker, Vitoria,, is a private polytechnic institute located in Vitoria-Gasteiz, Spain. The vocational training college was founded by Demetrio Ruiz de Alburuza in 1945. In 2012 it became the main component of the Diocesan EGIBIDE network. The college has played a significant role in the social and industrial development of Álava.

See also

 Catholic Church in Spain
 Higher education in Spain
 List of Jesuit universities and colleges

References  

Vocational education in Spain
Jesuit universities and colleges in Spain
Educational institutions established in 1942
1942 establishments in Spain